ESO 137-001 is a barred spiral galaxy located in the constellation Triangulum Australe and in the cluster Abell 3627. As the galaxy moves to the center of the cluster at 1900 km/s, it is stripped by hot gas, thus creating a 260,000 light-year long tail. This is called ram pressure stripping. The intergalactic gas in Abell 3627 is at 100 million Kelvin, which causes star formation in the tails.

History
The galaxy was discovered by Ming Sun in 2005.

Galaxy's fate

The stripping of gas is thought to have a significant effect on the galaxy's development, removing cold gas from the galaxy, shutting down the formation of new stars in the galaxy, and changing the appearance of inner spiral arms and bulges because of the effects of star formation.

Gallery

See also
 Abell 3627
 List of galaxies
 Jellyfish galaxy

References

External links

 NASA gallery: ESO 137-001
 Cornell University: The Flying Spaghetti Monster: Impact of magnetic fields on ram pressure stripping in disk galaxies

Triangulum Australe
Norma Cluster
Barred spiral galaxies
57532
57532
137-001